Ronald L. Vaughn is an educational administrator,  business and marketing expert serving as the president of the University of Tampa since 1995.

Educations 
He holds a bachelor's degree of marketing in 1968 and MBA of marketing in 1970 both at the Indiana State University, he obtained his PhD in marketing from the University of Georgia in 1975, and attended the Institute for Educational Management at Harvard University in 1994.

Career 
Vaughn was previously a consultant of marketing and business in his own small company.

He began his academic career at the Bradley University as a member in the faculty of marketing before joining the University of Tampa in 1984 as a coordinator in the department of Marketing and later was the Max H. Hollingsworth Endowed Chair of American Enterprise. He served as a director of its Masters of Business Administration program and dean of College of Business and Graduate Studies.
 
Since his appointed, he has held leadership positions as:

 President of the Tampa Bay Chapter of The Planning Forum, 
 Chairman of the American Red Cross Tampa Bay Chapter,
 President of the Florida West Coast Chapter of the American Marketing Association,
 Chairman of the Independent Colleges and Universities of Florida and president of the Sunshine State Athletic Conference.

Publications 
 Police services: a survey of citizensatisfaction. study conducted by Advisory Committee on Police-Community Relations Peoria, Ill. Peoria, Ill: Advisory Committee on Police-Community Relations, 1982. Statistics Surveys. Ronald L. Vaughn, 

 Preface: Marketing Nonprofit Organizations. Journal of the Academy of Marketing Science, v9 n1 (1/1981), Ronald L. Vaughn, Unique ID: 5723537378

 Multi-Attribute Approach To Understanding Shopping Behavior. Journal of the Academy of Marketing Science, v5 n2 (06/1977): 281-294. Ronald L. Vaughn, Behram J. Hansotia, Unique ID: 5723540710

Notes

External links 
 

Indiana State University alumni
University of Georgia alumni
Year of birth missing (living people)
Living people
American academic administrators

University of Tampa faculty
Bradley University faculty
Heads of universities and colleges in the United States